Jack Thorne may refer to:

 Jack Thorne, British writer and playwright
 Jack "Doc" Thorne, character in the novel Jurassic Park
 Jack Thorne (mathematician), British mathematician

See also
John Thorne (disambiguation)